Rebecca Rimmington (born 14 January 1983 in Grantham, England) is an English sportsperson, a competitive cyclist and former tandem pilot for blind and visually impaired riders.

At the 2009 UCI World Para-cycling Road Cup in Bogogno, Italy, Rimmington piloted Lora Turnham to a bronze medal in the Tandem Road Race.

, Rimmington is a member of the Zwift Academy triathlon team and is set to compete in the 2018 Ironman World Championships in Hawaiʻi.

Clubs and sponsors
2018 Zwift Academy
2016–2017 Team WNT Pro Cycling
2015 Ikon–Mazda
2014 Merlin Cycles
2013–2014 Trainsharp Race Team
2009–2010 Melton Olympic
2007–2009 VC St Raphael
2006–2007 Melton Olympic

Major results

World Paracycling Championships
2007 – 4th, Paracycling World Championships Road Race - Tandem with Melanie Easter
2007 – 4th, Paracycling World Championships Time Trial - Tandem with Melanie Easter
2007 – 4th, Paracycling World Championships 3km Pursuit - Tandem with Melanie Easter
2007 - 10th Paracycling World Championships Kilo - Tandem with Melanie Easter
2009 – , 3rd, Paracycling World Championships Road Race - Tandem with Lora Turnham
2010 -  British Paracycling Road Race Champion - Tandem with Lora Turnham
2010 - World Paracycling Road Ranking Number 1

Paracycling World Cup
2010 – , Gold, Paracycling World Cup Road Race, Segovia - Tandem with Lora Turnham
2010 - , Silver, Paracycling World Cup Time Trial, Segovia - Tandem with Lora Turnham

Paracycling Europa-Cup 
2007 – , Bronze, Paracycling Europa-Cup Gippengen - Tandem with Melanie Easter
2009 – , Silver, Paracycling Europa-Cup Piacenza Stage Race- Tandem with Lora Turnham
2010 – , Gold, Paracycling Europa-Cup Bayonne Stage Race - Tandem with Lora Turnham
2010 - , Gold, Paracycling Europa-Cup Bilbao Stage Race - Tandem with Lora Turnham

Other Paracycling achievements 
 2020 - Married Si Wilson.

References

External links
 
 
 

1983 births
Living people
English female cyclists
People from Grantham
English female triathletes